Van Buren Township is one of the seventeen townships of Hancock County, Ohio, United States. As of the 2010 census, the population was 915, of whom 694 lived in the unincorporated portions of the township.

Geography
Located in the southern part of the county, it borders the following townships:
Eagle Township - north
Madison Township - east
Washington Township, Hardin County - south
Liberty Township, Hardin County - southwest corner
Orange Township - west
Union Township - northwest corner

The village of Jenera is located in northern Van Buren Township.

Name and history
Statewide, other Van Buren Townships are located in Darke, Putnam, and Shelby counties.

Van Buren Township was organized in 1831. It was named for Martin Van Buren, who had at that time served as Secretary of State, and who would go on to become President of the United States.

Government
The township is governed by a three-member board of trustees, who are elected in November of odd-numbered years to a four-year term beginning on the following January 1. Two are elected in the year after the presidential election and one is elected in the year before it. There is also an elected township fiscal officer, who serves a four-year term beginning on April 1 of the year after the election, which is held in November of the year before the presidential election. Vacancies in the fiscal officership or on the board of trustees are filled by the remaining trustees.

References

External links

Townships in Hancock County, Ohio
Townships in Ohio